The 1962 Tennessee Volunteers football team (variously "Tennessee", "UT" or the "Vols") represented the University of Tennessee in the 1962 NCAA University Division football season. Playing as a member of the Southeastern Conference (SEC), the team was led by head coach Bowden Wyatt, in his eighth year, and played their home games at Shields–Watkins Field in Knoxville, Tennessee. They finished the season with a record of four wins and six losses (4–6 overall, 2–6 in the SEC). The Volunteers offense scored 179 points while the defense allowed 134 points.

Schedule

References

Tennessee
Tennessee Volunteers football seasons
Tennessee Volunteers football